The Abram Glenn House is a property in Triune, Tennessee that was listed on the National Register of Historic Places in 1988.  It dates from c.1815.

The NRHP-eligibility of the property was covered in a 1988 study of Williamson County historical resources.

The log house consists of two single pen log structures joined by a frame breezeway.  One of the pens is two-stories tall and was built c.1815;  the second pen, a kitchen with half dovetail notching, was added c.1825.  What was an open breezeway was enclosed c.1880, at the same time as the log pens were covered with weatherboard.

References

Houses on the National Register of Historic Places in Tennessee
Houses in Williamson County, Tennessee
Single pen architecture in Tennessee
Houses completed in 1815
National Register of Historic Places in Williamson County, Tennessee